Vashteh is a village in Kenar Rud Rural District of Bala Taleqan District of Taleqan County, Alborz province, Iran. At the 2006 census, its population was 388 in 110 households. The most recent census in 2016 counted 593 people in 207 households; it is the largest village in its rural district.

References 

Taleqan County

Populated places in Alborz Province

Populated places in Taleqan County